Amblyeleotris yanoi is a marine benthic species of goby native to reef environments of the western Pacific Ocean.

References

External links
 marinespecies.org
 

yanoi
Fish described in 1996